Roger A. Blais,  (February 4, 1926 – September 25, 2009) was a Canadian geological engineer and academic. He helped develop a number of prospecting and exploration technologies.

Born in Shawinigan, Quebec, he graduated from Université Laval and from the University of Toronto. In 1970, he was appointed a professor in economic geology and the first director of research at École Polytechnique de Montréal. He was the father of two children.

Honours
In 1975 he was awarded the Royal Society of Canada's Bancroft Award. In 1984 he was made an Officer of the Order of Canada and was promoted to Companion in 2002. In 1995 he was made an Officer of the National Order of Quebec. In 1997, he was awarded the Government of Quebec's Prix Armand-Frappier. He was a Fellow of the Royal Society of Canada and of the Engineering Institute of Canada.

References
 University of Ottawa Gazette feature
 
 Royal Society of Canada obituary

1926 births
2009 deaths
20th-century Canadian geologists
Fellows of the Royal Society of Canada
Fellows of the Engineering Institute of Canada
Officers of the National Order of Quebec
Companions of the Order of Canada
Academics in Quebec
People from Shawinigan
Université Laval alumni
University of Toronto alumni